Basic is the thirty-fourth album by American singer/guitarist Glen Campbell, released in 1978 (see 1978 in music).

Track listing
All tracks composed by Micheal Smotherman; except where indicated
Side 1:

"(You've Got To) Sing It Nice and Loud for Me Sonny" (Micheal Smotherman, Marc Durham) – 2:45
"Stranger in the Mirror" – 3:44
"Can You Fool" – 3:08
"I See Love" – 2:13
"(When I Feel Like) I Got No Love in Me" – 3:24

Side 2:
"Love Takes You Higher" – 2:39
"Never Tell Me No Lies" – 2:18 
"I'm Gonna Love You" – 3:22
"California" – 3:31
"Let's All Sing a Song About It" (Smotherman, Billy Burnette) – 3:14
"Grafhaidh Me Thu" – 2:36

Personnel
Glen Campbell – acoustic guitars, electric guitars, bagpipes
Craig Fall – acoustic guitars, electric guitars
Bill McCubbin – bass guitar
Steve Turner – drums
Ed Greene – drums
Micheal Smotherman – keyboards
Carl Jackson – acoustic guitars, electric guitars, banjo
Ethan Reilly – steel guitar
TJ Kuenster – piano
Fred Tackett – acoustic guitar
Lee Ritenour – guitar solo on "Never Tell Me No Lies"
Fred Tackett, Ed Greene, Carl Jackson, Micheal Smotherman, TJ Kuenster, Bill McCubbin, Steve Turner, Craig Fall, Dan Kuenster, David Turner, Laura Turner, Jo Dell Smotherman, Kathy Smotherman, Steve Crossley (who also adds acoustic guitar) - backing vocals
Sid Sharp, Jim Getzoff, David Schwartz, Linn Subotnick, Armand Kaproff - string quintet

Production
Producers – Glen Campbell, Tom Thacker
Recording Engineer – Chuck Mellone
Mastered – Wally Traugott, Capitol studios
String arrangements – TJ Kuenster, Larry Muhoberac
Photography – Norman Seeff

Charts
Album – Billboard (United States)

Singles – Billboard (United States)

References

Glen Campbell albums
1978 albums
Albums arranged by Larry Muhoberac
Capitol Records albums